Sam Tucker (1895–1973) was a rugby union international who represented England from 1922 to 1931. He also captained his country.

Early life
Sam Tucker was born on 1 June 1895 in Bristol.

Rugby union career
Tucker made his international debut on 21 January 1922 at Cardiff Arms Park in the Wales v England match.
Of the 27 matches he played for his national side he was on the winning side on 14 occasions.
He played his final match for England on 17 January 1931 at Twickenham in the England v Wales match. In 1930 he became the first rugby union player to take a flight to play in an international match. He received a late call-up for the game against Wales in Cardiff and took a flight from Bristol aerodrome to reach the ground in time.

Personal life
He married and had two children, Mary, who was born in 1926, and Janet.

References

1895 births
1973 deaths
England international rugby union players
English rugby union players
Gloucestershire County RFU players
Rugby union hookers
Rugby union players from Bristol